Al-Akhdar Sports Club (Nādī al-ʾAkhḍar al-Riyāḍī) is a Libyan football club based in Bayda, Libya.

Honours
Libyan Cup: 0
Finalist: 1976, 2005, 2007

Libyan SuperCup: 0
Finalist: 2005, 2007

Performance in CAF competitions
CAF Confederation Cup: 3 appearances
2006 – Preliminary Round
2008 – First round of 16
 2022-23 - TBD

Current squad
As of 5 October 2022

Coaching staff

External links
Official site

Akhdar
Association football clubs established in 1958
1958 establishments in Libya
Bayda, Libya